QTS Realty Trust, Inc. (popularly known as Quality Technology Services, QTS or QTS Data Centers) is a provider of carrier-neutral data centers and provides colocation services within North America and Northern Amsterdam and is based in Overland Park, Kansas. The company's largest operating areas are: Northern Virginia, Dallas/Fort Worth, Chicago, Hillsboro, Oregon, and New Jersey.

The company has been named the most sustainable company in the data center industry for two years in a row (2019, 2020) by World Finance Magazine. The company is also a member of the RE100, a global corporate leadership initiative bringing together influential businesses committed to 100% renewable electricity.

On August 31, 2021, QTS announced that companies affiliated with the Blackstone Group had completed the acquisition of the company for approximately $10 billion.

History

Timeline 
In 2003, Chad Williams founded the company with the purchase of a data center in Kansas.

In October 2005, the company acquired Deltacom's e^deltacom business unit and its data center in Suwanee, Georgia for $26 million.

In October 2006, the company acquired a 960,000 square foot data center in Atlanta as well as Globix Hosting LLC for a total of $161 million. The company also acquired NTT USA LLC, which owned a 130,000 square foot facility in the New York City area.

In December 2007, the company acquired the customers of First National Technology Solutions. The company also acquired 120,000 square feet of data center and office technology space in Silicon Valley.

In April 2008, the company expanded into Florida.

In 2010, the company acquired the former Qimonda semiconductor site in Richmond, Virginia and converted the property into a 1.3 million square foot mega data center. The MAREA and BRUSA subsea cable systems operated by Telxius terminate in this facility, forming the QTS Richmond Network Access Point. The QTS Richmond Network Access Point or the NAP was co-founded by Clint Heiden, former Chief Revenue Officer of QTS and Vinay Nagpal, President of InterGlobix, LLC.

In 2011, the company acquired a data center in Lenexa, Kansas.

In January 2013, the company acquired Herakles LLC and its 92,000 square-foot data center in San Francisco.

In February 2013, the company acquired 40 acres in Irving, Texas for construction of a data center facility.

In October 2013, the company became a public company via an initial public offering.

In April 2014, the company acquired the former Chicago Sun-Times plant with plans to convert it into a data center.

In June 2015, the company acquired Carpathia Hosting for $326 million.

In June 2016, the company acquired a data center campus in New Jersey from DuPont Fabros Technology for $125 million.

In January 2017, the company acquired a 260,000 square foot data center in Irving, Texas for $50 million.

In May 2017, the company acquired a 3.4-acre parcel next to its Atlanta facility for $1 million.

In April 2019, the company acquired 2 data centers in the Netherlands (Groningen and Eemshaven) for $44 million.

In November 2019, the company announced the expansion of its Atlanta data center campus, totaling more than 250,000 square feet of leasable capacity. Development finished in 2020.

In 2020, the company expanded its commitment to environmental sustainability by partnering with American Forests and World Vision. The company also started development on its greenfield data center campus in Hillsboro, Oregon with completion in 2021. The data center facility is run entirely with renewable energy.

In 2021, the company announced a total of eight data center facilities utilizing renewable energy to power operations.

Acquisitions and expansions 
In 2021, Blackstone Group Inc.'s infrastructure unit, Blackstone Infrastructure Partners and its nontraded real-estate investment trust, known as BREIT, have agreed to pay $78 a share for QTS. The acquisition was completed on August 31, 2021.

Data center locations 
QTS Realty Trust owns or operates 28 data center locations across the United States and Netherlands in the following areas:

United States 

 Arizona
 California
 Florida
 Georgia
 Illinois
 Kansas
 New Jersey
 Oregon
 Texas
 Virginia

Netherlands 

 Eemshaven
 Groningen

References

External links

2003 establishments in Kansas
American companies established in 2003
Companies listed on the New York Stock Exchange
Data centers
Real estate investment trusts of the United States
2013 initial public offerings
2021 mergers and acquisitions